Valerio Fiori (born 27 April 1969) is an Italian former professional footballer who played as a goalkeeper and current goalkeeping coach. He is currently a goalkeeping coach for Serie A club Genoa.

Career
Before being the third goalkeeper at A.C. Milan, he played for Lodigiani (one season), Lazio (six seasons), Cagliari (three seasons), Cesena, Fiorentina and Piacenza (1 season each). Though he made four appearances for Italy's Under-21 squad, Fiori was never called up for the senior side.

He has made only two official appearances in eight seasons with the club: a 4–2 loss in Serie A to Piacenza on 24 May 2003, and a 1–0 Coppa Italia win over Sampdoria as a first half injury replacement for Christian Abbiati on 18 December 2003.

After his retirement in 2008, Fiori became a goalkeeping coach at A.C. Milan until 2016. After a brief interlude with the Chinese side Shenzhen, and then Spanish side Deportivo La Coruña, a club coached by former teammate Clarence Seedorf, Milan announced the return of Fiori as goalkeeper coach on 5 July 2018. In August 2020, he was appointed as Napoli goalkeeper coach.

Personal life
Fiori graduated with a bachelor's degree in law from University of Rome La Sapienza on 12 July 2007.

References

External links
 Sky Sports profile

1969 births
Living people
Italian footballers
A.S. Lodigiani players
S.S. Lazio players
Cagliari Calcio players
A.C. Cesena players
ACF Fiorentina players
Piacenza Calcio 1919 players
A.C. Milan players
Serie A players
Serie B players
Association football goalkeepers
Footballers from Rome
Italy under-21 international footballers
UEFA Champions League winning players
Association football goalkeeping coaches
Italian expatriate sportspeople in China